"" (Christ, you light from true light) is a Catholic hymn in German, a paraphrase of the medieval Latin hymn "Summi parentis unica". It is a song about the apostles. In the common Catholic hymnal in German, Gotteslob, it is GL 546. The text was adapted in Münsterschwarzach Abbey, to a 1548 melody by Johann Leisentritt, revised by Erhard Quack in 1941.

References 

Catholic hymns